Joseph Rogers  (born 1861 or 1862) was a Welsh international footballer. He was part of the Wales national football team, playing 3 matches. He played his first match on 29 February 1896 against Ireland  and his last match on 21 March 1896 against Scotland.

At club level, he played for Brymbo Institute and Wrexham.

See also
 List of Wales international footballers (alphabetical)

References

1860s births
Wrexham A.F.C. players
Welsh footballers
Wales international footballers
Date of birth missing
Place of birth missing
Year of death missing
Association football defenders
Brymbo Institute F.C. players